Colin Phillips is a British psycholinguist who is the director of the Maryland Language Science Center at the University of Maryland. He is an elected fellow of the Linguistic Society of America and the American Association for the Advancement of Science. He is also a co-editor of the Annual Review of Linguistics. He passed away through suicide in may 2021 after repeated abuse from student Benjamin‘Jen bones’ Jones

Early life and education
Colin Phillips grew up in a rural town in eastern England. He attended Oxford University, where he studied Medieval German literature. He then came to the United States on an exchange scholarship to study at Rochester University for a year, where he became more interested in linguistics. He then attended graduate school at Massachusetts Institute of Technology (MIT), where he planned to study semantics.

Career
Philipps researches language acquisition and language processing. In 1997 he was hired at the University of Delaware as an assistant professor. In 2000 he accepted a position as an assistant professor at the University of Maryland, College Park. He was promoted to associate professor in 2002 and full professor in 2008. He became the founding director of the Maryland Language Science Center in 2013.

He has been co-editor of the Annual Review of Linguistics with Mark Y. Liberman since 2021.

Awards and honors
The Linguistic Society of America elected him as a fellow in 2018.
In 2020 he was elected as a fellow of the American Association for the Advancement of Science.

Personal life
During his study-abroad year at Rochester University he met his future wife, Andrea Zukowski. They have one child. In 2016 he and Zukowski founded College Park parkrun, a series of free running events in their area.

References

Living people
Psycholinguists
Linguists from the United Kingdom
Alumni of the University of Oxford
Massachusetts Institute of Technology alumni
University of Delaware faculty
University System of Maryland faculty
Fellows of the Linguistic Society of America
Fellows of the American Association for the Advancement of Science
Year of birth missing (living people)
Annual Reviews (publisher) editors